Steven DeMarchi is a Canadian guitarist, backing vocalist and songwriter. He is best known as the co-founder and lead guitarist of the bands Sheriff (1979–1985) and Alias (1988–1991). DeMarchi also played guitar for The Cranberries (1996–2003) and was the main guitarist for Dolores O'Riordan (2005–2008).

As a Billboard hit songwriter, DeMarchi is known for co-writing the hit songs "More Than Words Can Say", a 1990 Number 1 hit on the BillBoard Hot AC chart and Number 2 on the Billboard Hot 100 and “Haunted Heart”, a 1990 Number 18 hit on the US Mainstream Rock chart.

BMI presented DeMarchi with the "Million-air award" for the song "More Than Words Can Say". According to BMI’s web site, only 1,500 songs including "When I'm with You" by Sheriff have achieved Million-air status (one million air plays) among the 4.5 million songs by 300,000 BMI represented artists. One million performances is equal to approximately 50,000 broadcast hours, or more than 5.7 years of continuous airplay.

In 1982, DeMarchi performed live with Sheriff in LA on a nationwide TV show An Evening at the Improv. In 1990, he performed live with Alias on several national TV shows, including two performances on The Tonight Show - once with Johnny Carson and once with Jay Leno.

DeMarchi was guitarist for the band The Cranberries between 1996 and 2003. Between 2005 and 2007 Dolores O’Riordan, the voice of The Cranberries and DeMarchi recorded O'Riordans first solo record titled "Are You Listening". DeMarchi appeared with O'Riordan on many televised and radio live performances in 2007 in support of that record, and travelled to over 22 countries in Europe, North America and South America on the 2007 O'Riordan world tour.

In May 2007, DeMarchi along with other band members, were featured with O’Riordan in live performances on the Carson Daly Show, The Tonight Show with Jay Leno, True Music on HDnet cable network TV, and on Heaven and Earth BBC Manchester.

In January 2009, Alias (primarily DeMarchi and Curci) announced the release of their second album, appropriately titled Never Say Never. Live performances are expected during 2009 in support of this new album release.

Songwriting career
DeMarchi has collaborated with other successful songwriters like Steve Diamond, Jim Vallance, Freddy Curci, Arnold Lanni, Rick Neigher, Albert Hammond, and Jeff Paris just to name a few.

On the 1982 Sheriff album Sheriff, DeMarchi co-wrote with Arnold Lanni the songs:
Track 5-Kept Me Coming
Track 7-Crazy Without You

DeMarchi wrote most of the songs on the 1990 Alias album Alias with Freddy Curci, (the lead vocalist of Sheriff and Alias):
Track 1-Say What I Wanna Say
Track 2-Haunted Heart
Track 4-The Power
Track 5-Heroes
Track 6-What To Do
Track 7-After All The Love Is Gone
Track 8-More Than Words Can Say
Track 10-True Emotion
Track 11-Standing In The Darkness

On Curci's 1994 solo album "Dreamer's Road", DeMarchi collaborated in writing the songs:
Track 2-Dreamer's Road
Track 4-Just To Be Close
Track 8-Real Love
Track 9-Into the Fire
Track 10-Diamonds
Track 11-Life Goes On

On the 2006 Zion album, DeMarchi collaborated with Curci for the songs:
Track 2-How Much Longer Is Forever
Track 4-Dangerous
Track 7-No Surprise
Track 10-Who Do You think You Are
Track 11-Crash The Mirror

Discography

Sheriff
 1982 Sheriff (self-titled album), Capitol Records

Alias
 1990 Alias (self-titled album), EMI
 1990 Haunted Heart EP, EMI
 1991 Waiting For Love EP, EMI
 1992 Perfect World EP, EMI
 2009 Never Say Never

Freddy Curci
 1994 solo album, Dreamer's Road, EMI Music Canada
 2000 compilation album, Then and Now, Frontiers (Italy)

Zion
 2006 Zion(?), Frontiers Records

Dolores O'Riordan
 2007 Are You Listening?
 2009 No Baggage in the song "Stupid"

Singles

Filmography
1991 -  Don't Tell Mom the Babysitter's Dead
Soundtrack: Performer / Producer “Perfect World”

References
 
 "Billboard". Billboard Hot 100 airplay and sales charts. Retrieved June 11, 2006.
 Feldman, Christopher (2000). The Billboard Book of Number Two Hits. .
 LiveDairy interview Dolores O'Riordan
 Dreamer's Road, Heavy Harmonies Community
 Capitol Records Inc. (1988) Sheriff album cover insert. UPC 0 77777-91216-2 5
 Capitol Records Inc. (1990) Alias album cover insert. UPC 0 20831-4097-2 89
 EMI Music Canada (1994) Dreamer's Road album cover insert. UPC 7243 8 29339 22
 Frontier Records (2006) Zion album cover insert. UPC 8 024391 031322
 latest news update
 March 2009 Interview with Steve DeMarchi, Behind the Alias

External links
 Steve DeMarchi Myspace Profile
 The Official ALIAS Myspace Profile

Living people
Musicians from Toronto
Canadian male singers
Canadian singer-songwriters
Canadian people of Italian descent
Canadian rock guitarists
Canadian male guitarists
Sheriff (band) members
The Cranberries members
Alias (band) members
Year of birth missing (living people)